Terebra grayi is a species of sea snail, a marine gastropod mollusk in the family Terebridae, the auger snails.

Description

Distribution

References

 Bratcher T. & Cernohorsky W.O. (1987). Living terebras of the world. A monograph of the recent Terebridae of the world. American Malacologists, Melbourne, Florida & Burlington, Massachusetts. 240pp.
 Bouchet P. (1983 ["1982"]) Les Terebridae (Mollusca, Gastropoda) de l'Atlantique oriental. Bollettino Malacologico 18: 185-216
 Terryn Y. & Ryall P. (2014) West African Terebridae, with the description of a new species from the Cape Verde Islands. Conchylia 44(3-4): 27–47.

External links
 Fedosov, A. E.; Malcolm, G.; Terryn, Y.; Gorson, J.; Modica, M. V.; Holford, M.; Puillandre, N. (2020). Phylogenetic classification of the family Terebridae (Neogastropoda: Conoidea). Journal of Molluscan Studies

Terebridae
Gastropods described in 1877